is a coastal town located in Higashimuro District, Wakayama Prefecture, Japan. , the town had an estimated population of 15,192 in 8354 households and a population density of 110 persons per km2.

Geography
Kushimoto has the distinction of being the southernmost point of Japan's main island, Honshū. It is located at the southernmost tip of Kii Peninsula, with the urban area on the isthmus connecting Cape Shionomisaki with the mainland. The island of Kii Oshima is located on the east side of the city, and is connected by the Kushimoto Ohashi Bridge, which was completed in September 1999. Parts of the coastal area of the town are within the limits of the Yoshino-Kumano National Park and include the Hashiguiiwa Rocks, which are a National Natural Monument.

Neighboring municipalities
Wakayama Prefecture
Susami, to the west
Kozagawa, to the north
Nachikatsuura, to the east

Climate
Kushimoto has a Humid subtropical climate (Köppen Cfa) characterized by warm summers and cool winters with light to no snowfall. The average annual temperature in Kushimoto is 17.5 °C. The average annual rainfall is 2515 mm with September as the wettest month. The temperatures are highest on average in August, at around 26.9 °C, and lowest in January, at around 8.1 °C. Kushimoto has a very wet climate. The area is subject to typhoons and the moist winds of the Kuroshio Current in summer. Kushimoto is famous as the Typhoon Ginza (after Ginza in Tokyo). The wettest month was September 1929 with  whilst in January 2010 the town received no rain for the second time since records began in 1913 and had the lowest monthly humidity on record at 47 percent.

Demographics
Per Japanese census data, the population of Kushimoto has decreased steadily over the past 60 years.

On April 1, 2005, Kushimoto absorbed the town of Koza, from Higashimuro District, to become the new town of Kushimoto.

History
The area of the modern city of Shingū was within ancient Kii Province. During the Edo period it was part of the holdings of Kishū Domain, under a cadet branch of the Tokugawa clan, headquartered at Wakayama Castle.

In 1791 the US captains John Kendrick of the Lady Washington and William Douglas of the Grace visited Kushimoto, hoping to open a trading relationship with Japan. News was sent to Wakayama Castle, which sent troops. However, Kendrick and Douglas departed two days before the troops arrived. The result of this first visit of Americans to Japan was largely symbolic for the United States. For Japan it resulted in a new system of alarms and coastal patrols, increasing Japan's isolation under sakoku.

Kushimoto village was established on April 1, 1889, within Nishimuro District, Wakayama with the creation of the modern municipalities system. On September 16, 1890, the Ertuğrul incident occurred, in which an Imperial Ottoman Navy frigate flounders in a typhoon off of Kushimoto with great loss of life.

Kushimoto was elevated to town status on November 12, 1907. Over the next decades, the town grew as a result of numerous mergers with the surrounding village, annexing Fujihashi in 1924, Arita, Shiono-Misaki, Tanami, and Wabuka in 1955 and Oshima in 1958.  On April 1, 2005, Kushimoto merged with the town of Koza, from Higashimuro District.  Due to its strong ties with the city of Shingū both for political and economic reasons, Kushimoto became part of Higashimuro District upon this merger.

Being in a strategic location, Kushimoto was home to many military installations during World War II, including the Kushimoto Seaplane Base and Shionomisaki Airfield. Both bases were attacked by the United States Navy and Air Force in 1945, including a naval bombardment on the night of 24/25 July. Shionomisaki Airfield now serves as a small base for the Japanese Air Self-Defense Force.

Kushimoto (or specifically, Cape Shionomisaki) was the epicenter of the Great Nankai earthquake, a magnitude 8.0 earthquake that struck the area on December 21, 1946, at 4:19am. This triggered a tsunami that enveloped the central part of town. Most of the Fujihashi neighborhood was destroyed but has since been rebuilt. There are memorials around town marking the event, including signposts indicating how far the tsunami had penetrated inland. Of the 269 casualties in Wakayama Prefecture, the majority were in Kushimoto and in the city of Kainan.

On September 26, 1959, a typhoon hit Kushimoto directly, causing a large scale storm and storm surge damage mainly in the Tokai region (especially Nagoya). This typhoon, called the Isewan Typhoon, killed 5,000 people and was the deadliest typhoon in modern Japan.

Name origin
There are two widely accepted views of the origin of the name "Kushimoto" frm. The first is explained by a strange tree growing in a shrine in Cape Shionomisaki, whose seedling is thought to have floated from a far off island to its current resting place. An archaic compound form of the Chinese character for "kushi" (串) is said to have meant "strange tree"; in combination with the second character "moto" (本), the name is supposed to represent "strange tree's origin." Another explanation dictates that the "kushi" character is a visual abstraction of the town's layout; Cape Shionomisaki and Oshima act as the smaller upper "kuchi" (口) radical, while the mainland acts as the larger lower one. The "bo" (｜) radical that strikes through both of the others is said to represent the isthmus that runs through the town.

Communities and neighborhoods

Central
Fujihashi
Kushimoto

Western
Arita
Tanami
Wabuka

Eastern
Koza
Nishi-Mukai
Tahara

Southern
Oshima
Shiono-Misaki

Government
Kushimoto has a mayor-council form of government with a directly elected mayor and a unicameral town council of 13 members. Kushimoto, collectively with the other municipalities in Higashimuro District, contributes two members to the Wakayama Prefectural Assembly. In terms of national politics, the town is part of Wakayama 3rd district of the lower house of the Diet of Japan.

Economy
Primary industries include horticulture and  commercial fishing.

Education
Kushimoto has nine public elementary schools and four public middle schools operated by the town government and one public high school operated by the Wakayama Prefectural Department of Education.

High schools
Kushimoto Koza High School

Junior high schools
Kushimoto Junior High School
Kushimoto-Nishi Junior High School
Nishi-Mukai Junior High School
Shionomisaki Junior High School

Elementary schools
Hashigui Elementary School
Kushimoto Elementary School
Koza Elementary School
Izumo Elementary School
Nishi-Mukai Elementary School
Oshima Elementary School
Shionomisaki Elementary School
Tahara Elementary School
Kushimoto Nishi Elementary School

Transportation

Railway
 JR West – Kisei Main Line
 -  -  -  -  -  -  -

Highway
  Kisei Expressway

Local attractions 

Hashigui Beach
Hashigui-Iwa Coastal Scenic Area
Kashinozaki Lighthouse
Koza Coastal Scenic Area
Koza River
Kuroshima and Taijima
Kushimoto Marine Park
Okyoro Art Museum
Shionomisaki Lighthouse
Shionomisaki Southernmost Point Park
Shionomisaki Youth Hostel
Turkish Memorial and Museum
Umikongo Coastal Scenic Area
United States Friendship Museum

Kushimoto is famous for its many coastal rock formations, including Hashigui-Iwa and Umikongo. Cape Shionomisaki, located in the southern tip of the town, has a park and tower marking the southernmost point of Honshū. The island of Kii-Oshima, connected to the main town via a bridge, is home to two museums:
 The Turkish Memorial and Museum, located on the southeastern end of the island, commemorates the foundering and sinking of the Turkish ship Ertugrul on the rocky Oshima shore. As of 2005, there was discussion of salvaging the wreckage with a Turkish team to exhibit it in the local museum.
The United States Friendship Museum commemorates the visit of the brig Lady Washington and the brig Grace, which in 1791 took place decades before Commodore Matthew Perry's famed landing in Japan and opening of diplomatic relations with the United States. The museum also hosts a collection of American artifacts and items of nostalgia from its sister city, Hemet, in the United States.

Kushimoto had been the northernmost point where coral was found in Japan, beyond the Darwin Point of 29N latitude.  Nevertheless, the meandering Kuroshio warm current that normally protects the coral, led to influx of cold water in 2018 that killed off most of the coral.  Both water too hot or too cold can bleach coral.

Water sports
The surrounding wetlands and coastal areas in Kushimoto are designated areas of conservation through the Ramsar Convention of 1971. They have since become popular spots for scuba diving, with numerous diving establishments along National Highway 42.

The Kozagawa River, regulated by the Shichikawa Dam, is one of three rivers in southern Wakayama Prefecture known for kayaking.

Though waves are relatively tame compared with worldwide standards, Kushimoto is a popular surfing spot for locals and people from the bigger cities in the Kansai area.

Annual events and festivals
In late January or early February is the Shiono-Misaki Fire Festival. During this event, the large grassy field that designates Honshū's southernmost tip is ritually burned. Spectators may walk through the fire as it progresses through the field.

In February is the Oshima Boat Race. Festivals grounds are set up at Oshima Port, and two boats ritually race to and from the port on the mainland Kushimoto.

In August, the Summer Fireworks Festival takes place at Kushimoto Port.

In October is the Sunset Marathon. The marathon's route winds through Oshima and Shiono-Misaki.

Notable people from Kushimoto 
Sanma Akashiya, TV comedian and actor

Sister city relations 
Kushimoto has three sister cities: 
 Yakakent (Turkey)
 Mersin (Turkey)
 Hemet, California (United States)

See also
125 Years Memory: Drama film commemorating the 125th anniversary of the Ertuğrul incident

References

External links

Official website 

Towns in Wakayama Prefecture
Populated coastal places in Japan
Kushimoto, Wakayama